Several vessels have been named City of London for the City of London:
 was launched as an East Indiaman. She made six voyages for the British East India Company (EIC) between 1800 and 1814 when she was taken up as a troopship for one voyage. She made one more voyage to India under a license from the EIC and then was broken up circa 1817.
 was launched in Newcastle. She spent most of her brief career sailing as a West Indiaman. A French privateer captured her in January or February 1806.
, 2560GRT, was launched in Glasgow in 1863 and was lost in 1881.
, 8956GRT, was a commercial liner that the Admiralty commandeered for conversion to an  Armed Merchant Cruiser in the Royal Navy. She was commissioned as HMS City of London on 8 January 1916. She was armed with eight 6" guns and two 6-pounder Anti-Aircraft guns. She escorted convoys across the Atlantic and also to Asia. City of London  was returned to her owners on 6 July 1819. She was broken up in May 1946.

In addition, during World War I the Royal Navy also employed three other vessels named City of London: a Fishery Reserve vessel, a hired drifter, and a hired trawler

Ship names